COVID-19 pandemic in Georgia may refer to:

 COVID-19 pandemic in Georgia (country)
 COVID-19 pandemic in Georgia (U.S. state)